Born in 69 is the fifth studio album by French DJ Bob Sinclar, released on 14 July 2009 on Yellow Productions.

Track listings

Charts

Weekly charts

Year-end charts

References

External links
 
 

Yellow Productions albums
2009 albums
Bob Sinclar albums